GDP-mannose 4,6 dehydratase is an enzyme that in humans is encoded by the GMDS gene.

References

Further reading